Marvin Preston Braden (January 25, 1938 – March 14, 2022) was a former American football and lacrosse coach. He was the head football coach at Northeast Missouri State College—now known as Truman State University—from 1967 to 1968 and United States International University—now known as Alliant International University from 1969 to 1972, compiling a career college football coaching record of 34–22–1. Braden served as an assistant coach for several National Football League (NFL) teams including the Denver Broncos, San Diego Chargers, Phoenix Cardinals and Cincinnati Bengals.

Head coaching record

Football

References

1938 births
Living people
Cincinnati Bengals coaches
Denver Broncos coaches
Iowa State Cyclones football coaches
Lafayette Leopards football coaches
Lafayette Leopards men's lacrosse coaches
Michigan State Spartans football coaches
Missouri State Bears football players
Missouri Tigers football coaches
Parsons Wildcats football coaches
Phoenix Cardinals coaches
San Diego Chargers coaches
St. Louis Cardinals (football) coaches
Truman Bulldogs football coaches
United States International Gulls football coaches
Sportspeople from Kansas City, Missouri
Players of American football from Kansas City, Missouri